Cisne is a village in Wayne County, Illinois, United States. The population was 672 at the 2010 census.

History
Cisne was named in 1870 in honor of Levi Cisne on the suggestion of Charles A. Beecher, who was influential in building the railroad and the station around which the village of Cisne grew.

Geography

Demographics

As of the census of 2000, there were 673 people, 291 households, and 185 families residing in the village. The racial makeup of the village was 98.81% White, 0.30% African American, 0.30% Asian, and 0.59% from two or more races. Hispanic or Latino of any race were 0.59% of the population.

There were 291 households, out of which 26.5% had children under the age of 18 living with them, 51.5% were married couples living together, 9.3% had a female householder with no husband present, and 36.4% were non-families. 34.0% of all households were made up of individuals, and 22.7% had someone living alone who was 65 years of age or older. The average household size was 2.22 and the average family size was 2.78.

In the village, the age distribution of the population shows 21.8% under the age of 18, 9.8% from 18 to 24, 22.6% from 25 to 44, 18.3% from 45 to 64, and 27.5% who were 65 years of age or older. The median age was 42 years. For every 100 females, there were 83.9 males. For every 100 females age 18 and over, there were 76.5 males.

The median income for a household in the village was $26,172, and the median income for a family was $34,286. Males had a median income of $26,635 versus $25,234 for females. The per capita income for the village was $14,044. About 12.4% of families and 15.5% of the population were below the poverty line, including 13.5% of those under age 18 and 22.4% of those age 65 or over.

Notable people 

 A. T. Hill, Nebraska car salesman and Nebraska State Historical Society archaeologist; born in Cisne
 Bill Trotter, pitcher for the St. Louis Browns, Washington Senators and St. Louis Cardinals; born in Cisne

References

Villages in Illinois
Villages in Wayne County, Illinois
Populated places established in 1870
1870 establishments in Illinois